Hermenegildo Alóitez (c. 898 – before 10 December 966), was a magnate and member of the highest nobility of Galicia in the 10th century.

Biographical sketch 
Hermenegildo came from a prominent family with ties to the crown and church.  A paternal uncle was Count Hermenegildo Gutiérrez, who defeated the Muslim troops and conquered Oporto and Coimbra and was the father of Queen Elvira Menéndez, wife of King Ordoño II, and grandfather of Saint Rudesind, of Queen Adosinda Gutiérrez, the first wife of King Ramiro II, and of Count Osorio Gutiérrez the founder of the Monastery of Lourenzá.  A Count Osorio, the other grandfather of Queen Adosinda and Count Osorio Gutiérrez, has been identified as another uncle.  He had three brothers; Gundesindo Alóitez, Bishop of Iria Flavia, Arias, and Count Gutierre Alóitez.

In 920, he was named Count of Présaras by King Ramiro II whom he served as his mayordomo mayor from 937 to 949.  With his wife Paterna he founded in 952 the Monastery of Sobrado dos Monges. This monastery was inherited by his descendants, members of the House of Traba, and nearly two centuries later, in January 1142, two of the most relevant members of this lineage, the brothers Fernando and Bermudo Pérez de Traba, handed it over to the Cistercian monks. In 958, Hermenegildo and Paterna transferred the county of Présaras to the monastery which they had founded and, in that same year, he retired there where he lived as a monk the rest of his life. He died before 10 December 966 and was buried at his monastery.

Marriage and issue 

He married Paterna Gundesíndiz (died before December 955), daughter of Gundesindo and Senior, with whom he appears in 916 buying certain properties. They were the parents of
 Sisnando Menéndez (died in 968) Bishop of Iria Flavia, because of a conflict with King Sancho I of León, he was dispossessed of his privileges which were given to Bishop Rudesind, although he was able to recover them at a later date. He died in 968 fighting against the Norman invaders.
 Rodrigo Menéndez, dux and owner of the castle in Aranga, married to Elvira Alóitez.  One of their sons, Gutierre Rodríguez and his wife Gundesinda were the parents of Ilduara Gutiérrez, the mother of Elvira de Faro, the first wife of count Froila Vermúdez. The latter had several children, including Count Pedro Fróilaz de Traba and it was through this marriage that the Monastery of Sobrado was inherited by the Traba brothers, Fernando and Bermudo.
 A daughter whose name is not recorded, the wife of García Íñiguez. In 984, their daughter Jimena Garcés, made a donation to the Monastery of Sobrado where she mentions her parents and her maternal uncles Sisnando and Rodrigo.

Notes

References

Bibliography 
 
 
 
 
 
 

10th-century Galician people
890s births
966 deaths
Year of birth uncertain
10th-century nobility from the Kingdom of León